The effective diffusion coefficient of a  in atomic diffusion of solid polycrystalline materials like metal alloys is often represented as a weighted average of the grain boundary diffusion coefficient and the lattice diffusion coefficient.  Diffusion along both the grain boundary and in the lattice may be modeled with an Arrhenius equation. The ratio of the grain boundary diffusion activation energy over the lattice diffusion activation energy is usually 0.4–0.6, so as temperature is lowered, the grain boundary diffusion component increases.  Increasing temperature often allows for increased grain size, and the lattice diffusion component increases with increasing temperature, so often at 0.8 Tmelt (of an alloy), the grain boundary component can be neglected.

Modeling
The effective diffusion coefficient can be modeled using Hart's equation when lattice diffusion is dominant (type A kinetics):

where
effective diffusion coefficient
grain boundary diffusion coefficient
lattice diffusion coefficient

value based on grain shape, 1 for parallel grains, 3 for square grains
average grain size
grain boundary width, often assumed to be 0.5 nm

Grain boundary diffusion is significant in face-centered cubic metals below about 0.8 Tmelt (Absolute). Line dislocations and other crystalline defects can become significant below ~0.4 Tmelt in FCC metals.

References

See also 
 Kirkendall effect
 Phase transformations in solids
 Mass diffusivity

Diffusion